The Queen's Gambit is the chess opening that starts with the moves:
1. d4 d5
2. c4

It is one of the oldest openings and is still commonly played today. It is traditionally described as a gambit because White appears to sacrifice the c-pawn; however, this could be considered a misnomer as Black cannot retain the pawn without incurring a disadvantage.

History
The Queen's Gambit is one of the oldest known openings in chess. It was mentioned in the Göttingen manuscript of 1490 and was later analyzed by Gioachino Greco in the 17th century. In the 18th century, it was recommended by Philipp Stamma and is sometimes known as the Aleppo Gambit in his honor.  During the early period of modern chess, queen pawn openings were not in fashion, and the Queen's Gambit did not become commonplace until the 1873 tournament in Vienna.

After the resumption of international chess activity following World War II, it was less frequently seen as many players moved away from symmetrical openings, tending to use an Indian Defence to combat queen pawn openings; however, it is still frequently played.

Overview
Note that Black cannot hold the pawn, for example: 1.d4 d5 2.c4 dxc4 3.e3 b5 (Black tries to guard their pawn but should pursue  with 3...Nf6 or 3...e5) 4.a4 c6? 5.axb5 cxb5 6.Qf3! winning a piece.

The Queen's Gambit is divided into two major categories based on Black's response: the Queen's Gambit Accepted (QGA) and the Queen's Gambit Declined (QGD). In the QGA, Black plays 2...dxc4, temporarily giving up the center to obtain freer development. In the QGD, Black usually plays to hold d5. Frequently Black will be cramped, but Black aims to exchange pieces and use  at c5 and e5 to free Black's game.

Variations 
Technically, any Black response other than 2...dxc4 (or another line with an early ...dxc4 that transposes into the QGA) is a Queen's Gambit Declined, but the Slav, Albin Countergambit, and Chigorin Defense are generally treated separately. There are so many QGD lines after 2...e6 that many of them are distinctive enough to warrant separate treatment.  The Orthodox Defense and the Tarrasch Defense are two important examples.  (See Queen's Gambit Declined for more.)

After 1.d4 d5 2.c4:
 2...e6 – Queen's Gambit Declined or QGD (ECO D30–D69). This is the main line, with many variations.
 2...dxc4 – Queen's Gambit Accepted or QGA (D20–D29). Less popular than the Queen's Gambit Declined, it nevertheless has a solid reputation.
 2...c6 – Slav Defense (D10–D19). This is a solid response, although many variations are very tactical. If Black plays both ...c6 and ...e6 (in either order), the opening takes characteristics of both the Slav and the Orthodox Defense and is classified as a Semi-Slav Defense.
 2...e5 – Albin Countergambit (D08–D09), a sharp attempt by Black to gain the initiative. It is uncommon in top-level chess but can be a dangerous weapon in club play.
 2...Nc6 – Chigorin Defense (D07) The Chigorin Defense takes the game away from the normal positional channels of the QGD and has been favored by Alexander Morozevich at the top level; it appears to be  for Black.
 2...Bf5 – Baltic Defense (D06), an offbeat but playable line.
 2...c5 – Symmetrical Defense (D06). This is rarely played; although it has not been definitely refuted, the play seems to favor White.
 2...Nf6 – Marshall Defense (D06), named after Frank Marshall, who first devised the move, he briefly played it in the 1920s before abandoning it. 
 2...g6?! – Alekhine idea (D06). White can gain the advantage by 3.cxd5 Qxd5 (3...Nf6 4.Qa4 ) 4.Nc3 Qa5 5.Nf3 Bg7 6.Bd2 c6 7.e4 Qb6 8.Bc4 Bxd4 9.Nxd4 Qxd4 10.Qb3 Qg7 11.0-0 +/− (Minev).

References

Further reading
 
 
 
 
 Lemos, Damian. (2015). The Queen's Gambit. Everyman Chess. . OCLC 921240674.

External links

 "Queen's Gambit" video and explanation, TheChessWebsite.com
 "Queen's Gambit Accepted Traps" video and explanation, Chessworld.net

15th century in chess
Chess openings